Lawrence Albert "Al" Siebert, (January 21, 1934 - June 25, 2009) was an American author and educator. A native of Oregon, he was best known for his research on psychological resilience and the inner nature of highly resilient survivors. He taught at Portland State University in Portland for more than 40 years.

Early life
Lawrence Albert Siebert was born in Portland, Oregon, to Donald and Mildred Siebert on January 21, 1934. Raised in Portland, he graduated from Grant High School in Northeast Portland.

He became an army paratrooper, joining for a short time at the end of the Korean War.

Education
Siebert attended Willamette University in Salem, Oregon, and graduated in 1958 with a Bachelor of Arts degree in psychology.

He earned his master's in clinical psychology from the University of Michigan in 1960. He received his PhD from the same University in 1965.

Teacher
As adjunct professor, he taught management psychology seminars for over forty years at Portland State University. He was the author of several books on resiliency and survivor traits.

Shortly after receiving his degree in 1965, Siebert was awarded a prestigious post-doctoral fellowship by the Menninger Institute. When he moved to Topeka to start his fellowship, he told his supervisors about some of his recent breakthroughs with understanding schizophrenia; this led to what he later described as having a "peak life" experience on his own part. The Menninger psychiatrists immediately declared him severely mentally ill, canceled his fellowship, and had him locked up in the back ward of a nearby V.A. psychiatric hospital diagnosed with paranoid schizophrenia.

Nevertheless, a month later he "eloped" from the V.A. hospital and returned to his home in Oregon (he left “against medical advice”). After this, he began a very successful 35-year career as a teacher, author, and community leader.

Media appearances
Siebert was a guest on radio and television interviews and call-in shows such as NPR, CNN, Oprah, and  NBC's Today Show, and was featured in magazine articles in USA Today Weekend, Family Circle, Men's Fitness, Prevention Magazine, Good Housekeeping, Harvard Business Review, and Dr. Andrew Weil's Self-Healing Newsletter,. His "How Resilient Are You?" quiz has been reprinted in many publications.

He was frequently quoted in newspapers articles and other mass media as an expert on issues of workspace stress and resilience.

Later life and death
Siebert lived in Portland with his wife Molly and spoke to business, government and military leaders on developing resiliency skills. Siebert died on June 25, 2009, in Portland at the age of 75 from colon cancer.

Bibliography
Al Siebert, Peaking Out: How My Mind Broke Free from the Delusions in Psychiatry (Portland, OR: Practical Psychology Press, 1995)
The Resiliency Advantage: Master Change, Thrive Under Pressure, and Bounce Back From Setbacks, released in June 2005, won the 2006 Independent Publisher Book Award for Best Independent Self-Help book. Also published in Spanish, Simplified Chinese, and Japanese language editions.
The Survivor Personality: Why Some People Are Stronger, Smarter, and More Skillful at Handling Life's Difficulties...and How You Can Be, Too fifteenth printing. Also published in German, Dutch, Russian, Hebrew, Chinese, Japanese, Korean, and United Kingdom editions. 
 Co-author of The Adult Student's Guide to Survival and Success, 6th Edition with Mary Karr, MS. A 'survival' guide to college for first-time or returning non-traditional adult students (over age 24).

See also 
 Psychological resilience

References

External links
 ResiliencyCenter.com Most recent biographical info from Dr. Siebert's own website
Obituary

1934 births
2009 deaths
American motivational writers
Willamette University alumni
University of Michigan College of Literature, Science, and the Arts alumni
Portland State University faculty
Grant High School (Portland, Oregon) alumni